Afanasiy Remnyov (1890–1919) was a Soviet soldier during the Russian Civil War. Remnyov played roles in the 1917 July Days in Petrograd, the establishing of the Soviet regime in Minsk and organizing military resistance against advancing German armies near Bryansk.

External links
 Bondarenko, V. Afanasiy Remnyov. The first Red Officer. (Афанасий Ремнёв. Первый красный офицер). IMHO. 3 April 2017
 Zemanek, A., Kyryevskyi, V. The 1918 Battle for Shostka (Битва за Шостку 1918 року). Istorychna Pravda (Ukrayinska Pravda). 2 June 2018
 German intervention and struggle against it. Starting period of the Russian Civil War (ГЕРМАНСКАЯ ИНТЕРВЕНЦИЯ И БОРЬБА С НЕЮ. НАЧАЛЬНЫЙ ПЕРИОД ГРАЖДАНСКОЙ ВОЙНЫ). Bryanskiy krai.

1890 births
1919 deaths
People from Tambov Oblast
People from Tambov Governorate
Old Bolsheviks
Russian military personnel of World War I
Soviet people of the Ukrainian–Soviet War
People of the Russian Revolution
Russian revolutionaries